Fitz Henry Warren (January 11, 1816 – June 1878) was a politician and a Union Army general during the American Civil War.

Early life and career
Warren was born in Brimfield, Massachusetts. In August 1844, he moved to Burlington in the Iowa Territory where he was a journalist and editorial contributor for the Burlington Hawkeye." He was an early political activist in the Whig Party. He was reported to have been the first to propose the nomination of General Zachary Taylor for President.  He was a delegate to the National Whig Convention in 1848.

Upon the subsequent inauguration of President Taylor in 1849, Fitz Henry Warren was appointed First Assistant Postmaster General. After the death of Taylor, Warren resigned his position in protest of President Millard Fillmore's support of the Fugitive Slave Law. With the growing support of Anti-Slavery Whigs, Fitz Henry Warren was made secretary of the Whig Party National Executive Committee.

Warren was chairman of the Des Moines County delegation to the convention of 1856 that organized the Republican Party and nominated John C. Frémont as the first Republican presidential candidate.

Civil War
In 1861 he was one of the chief editorial writers on the New York Tribune and the author of the controversial "On to Richmond" articles after the First Battle of Bull Run.

He returned to Iowa following First Bull Run and, as Colonel, helped to raise the 1st Regiment Iowa Volunteer Cavalry. On July 18, 1862, President Abraham Lincoln appointed Warren to the grade of brigadier general of volunteers, to rank from July 16, 1862, with a command in the army in Missouri under Major General Samuel R. Curtis.

In 1863 General Warren was the leading candidate before the Republican State Convention for Governor of Iowa, but by a combination of the supporters of other candidates, Warren was defeated. On February 21, 1866, President Andrew Johnson nominated Warren for appointment to the grade of brevet major general of volunteers, to rank from August 24, 1865, and the United States Senate confirmed the appointment on April 26, 1866. Warren was mustered out of the volunteers on August 24, 1865.

Postbellum career
In 1866 Warren was elected to the Iowa State Senate.  After serving one session, he was appointed by President Andrew Johnson as the United States Minister to Guatemala where he served two years, until 1869. He served as a presidential elector on the Democratic ticket in 1872.

He died at his native Brimfield, Massachusetts, June 21, 1878 and is buried in Brimfield Cemetery Brimfield, Massachusetts.

See also

List of American Civil War generals (Union)

Notes

References
 Eicher, John H., and David J. Eicher, Civil War High Commands. Stanford: Stanford University Press, 2001. .
 History of Iowa, Vol. IV, 1903.
 Iowa, Its History and Tradition'', Vol. III, 1804-1926.
iagenweb.org biography of Warren
Attribution

External links

1816 births
1878 deaths
American columnists
Iowa state senators
Union Army generals
People of Iowa in the American Civil War
Ambassadors of the United States to Guatemala
People from Brimfield, Massachusetts
Politicians from Burlington, Iowa
Iowa Whigs
19th-century American politicians
United States Postal Service people
Iowa Republicans
New-York Tribune personnel
Iowa Democrats
1872 United States presidential electors
19th-century American diplomats
19th-century American journalists
American male journalists
19th-century American male writers
Military personnel from Massachusetts